Pinki Rani Jangra (Born 28 April 1990) is a flyweight Indian boxer from Hisar, Haryana and a four time national champion. She won bronze medal in the 2014 Commonwealth Games. She won gold medal at the President's Cup International Boxing in Palembang, South Sumatra, Indonesia, in 2015. She won gold medals at the 2011 National Games of India and the 2012 and 2014 National championships in the flyweight (51kgs) division. She was the only Indian pugilist who bagged the gold medal at the Arafura Games. She signed up with Sporty Boxing Private Limited, which is referred to as the commercial arm of the Indian Boxing Council (IBC), the licensing body for professional boxers in India.

Pinki is known as Giant Killer due to her achievements in domestic competitions. She has defeated London Olympic Games bronze medalist and six-time world champion Mary Kom in National Boxing Championship 2009 and CWG 2014 qualification trial, as well as five-time Asian champion and world champion Laishram Sarita Devi in National Games and National Boxing Championship 2011.

Pinki represented India in Boxing at the 2018 Commonwealth Games in 51kgs weight category.  However, she lost to England's Lisa Whiteside in her quarterfinal bout.

Personal life 
Pinki Jangra was born on 28 April 1990 in Hisar, Haryana. She's the daughter of a homemaker Prem Devi and a Government official Krishan Kumar. She studied till 12th grade and reminisces her hobbies as dancing, playing and boxing. She was initially coached by Raj Singh and later switched to Anoop Kumar.

International achievements

National achievements
All India Inter-Railway Boxing Championship, Bilaspur, Gold in Feb, 2015
1st Monnet Women Elite National Boxing Championship, Raipur, Gold in 2014
All India Inter-Railway Boxing Championships, Agra, Gold in March 2014
13th Senior Women's National Boxing Championship, Guwahati, Gold in Nov, 2012
10th Senior Women National Boxing Championship at J.R.D. Tata Sports Complex, Jamshedpur, Silver in October, 2009 
34th National Games (Women Boxing), Jamshedpur, Gold in 2011

Records 

 Federation Cup Women Boxing Championship, Erode, Tamil Nadu, 2009
 N.C. Sharma Memorial Federation Cup Women Boxing Championship, Nainital, Gold in November, 2009 
 S.H.N.C. Sharma Memorial Federation Cup Women Boxing Championship, Uttarakhand, Gold in 2010-11
 9th Senior Women Haryana State Boxing Championship, Panipat, Gold in 2010
 10th Senior Women Haryana State Boxing Championship, Mehandergarh, Gold in 2011
 7th Senior Women North India Boxing Championship, Himachal Pradesh, Gold in 2012
 4th Inter-Zonal Women National Boxing Championship, Vishakhpatnam, Gold in 2012

References

Living people
1990 births
Boxers at the 2014 Commonwealth Games
Boxers at the 2018 Commonwealth Games
Commonwealth Games bronze medallists for India
Sportswomen from Haryana
Indian women boxers
Commonwealth Games medallists in boxing
Boxers from Haryana
Flyweight boxers
21st-century Indian women
Medallists at the 2014 Commonwealth Games